The 27th Producers Guild of America Awards (also known as 2016 Producers Guild Awards), honoring the best film and television producers of 2015, were held at the Hyatt Regency Century Plaza in Los Angeles, California on January 23, 2016. The nominations for documentary film were announced on November 23, 2015, and the nominations for television were announced on December 8, 2015. The final film and television nominations were announced on January 5, 2016.

Winners and nominees

Film
{| class=wikitable style="width="100%"
|-
! colspan="2" style="background:#abcdef;"| Darryl F. Zanuck Award for Outstanding Producer of Theatrical Motion Pictures
|-
| colspan="2" style="vertical-align:top;"|
 The Big Short – Brad Pitt, Dede Gardner, and Jeremy Kleiner Bridge of Spies – Steven Spielberg, Marc Platt, and Kristie Macosko Krieger
 Brooklyn – Finola Dwyer and Amanda Posey
 Ex Machina – Andrew Macdonald and Allon Reich
 Mad Max: Fury Road – Doug Mitchell and George Miller
 The Martian – Simon Kinberg, Ridley Scott, Michael Schaefer, and Mark Huffam
 The Revenant – Arnon Milchan, Steve Golin, Alejandro G. Iñárritu, Mary Parent, and Keith Redmon
 Sicario – Basil Iwanyk, Edward L. McDonnell, and Molly Smith
 Spotlight – Michael Sugar, Steve Golin, Nicole Rocklin, and Blye Pagon Faust
 Straight Outta Compton – Ice Cube, Matt Alvarez, F. Gary Gray, Dr. Dre, and Scott Bernstein
|-
! colspan="2" style="background:#abcdef;"| Outstanding Producer of Animated Theatrical Motion Pictures
|-
| colspan="2" style="vertical-align:top;"|
 Inside Out – Jonas Rivera Anomalisa – Rosa Tran, Duke Johnson, and Charlie Kaufman
 The Good Dinosaur – Denise Ream
 Minions – Chris Meledandri and Janet Healy
 The Peanuts Movie – Craig Schulz and Michael J. Travers
|-
! colspan="2" style="background:#abcdef;"| Outstanding Producer of Documentary Theatrical Motion Pictures
|-
| colspan="2" style="vertical-align:top;"|
 Amy – James Gay-Rees The Hunting Ground – Amy Ziering
 The Look of Silence – Signe Byrge Sørensen
 Meru – Jimmy Chin and Elizabeth Chai Vasarhelyi
 Something Better to Come – Sigrid Dyekjær and Hanna Polak
|}

Television
{| class=wikitable style="width="100%"
|-
! colspan="2" style="background:#abcdef;"| Norman Felton Award for Outstanding Producer of Episodic Television, Drama
|-
| colspan="2" style="vertical-align:top;"|
 Game of Thrones (HBO) – David Benioff, D. B. Weiss, Bernadette Caulfield, Frank Doelger, Carolyn Strauss, Bryan Cogman, Lisa McAtackney, Chris Newman, Greg Spence Better Call Saul (AMC) – Vince Gilligan, Peter Gould, Melissa Bernstein, Mark Johnson, Stewart A. Lyons, Thomas Schnauz, Gennifer Hutchison, Nina Jack, Diane Mercer, Bob Odenkirk
 Homeland (Showtime) – Alex Gansa, Alexander Cary, Lesli Linka Glatter, Howard Gordon, Chip Johannessen, Meredith Stiehm, Patrick Harbinson, Michael Klick, Claire Danes, Lauren White
 House of Cards (Netflix) – Beau Willimon, Dana Brunetti, John David Coles, Joshua Donen, David Fincher, Eric Roth, Kevin Spacey, Robert Zotnowski, Karen Moore
 Mad Men (AMC) – Matthew Weiner, Scott Hornbacher, Janet Leahy, Semi Chellas, Erin Levy, Jon Hamm, Blake McCormick, Tom Smuts
|-
! colspan="2" style="background:#abcdef;"| Danny Thomas Award for Outstanding Producer of Episodic Television, Comedy
|-
| colspan="2" style="vertical-align:top;"|
 Transparent (Amazon) – Jill Soloway, Andrea Sperling, Victor Hsu, Nisha Ganatra, Rick Rosenthal, Bridget Bedard Inside Amy Schumer (Comedy Central) – Amy Schumer, Daniel Powell, Jessi Klein, Steven Ast, Tony Hernandez, Kim Caramele, Ryan Cunningham, Kevin Kane, Ayesha Rokadia
 Modern Family (ABC) – Steven Levitan, Christopher Lloyd, Paul Corrigan, Abraham Higginbotham, Jeff Morton, Jeffrey Richman, Brad Walsh, Danny Zuker, Vali Chandrasekaran, Megan Ganz, Elaine Ko, Kenny Schwartz, Chuck Tatham, Rick Wiener, Chris Smirnoff, Sally Young
 Silicon Valley (HBO) – Mike Judge, Alec Berg, Jim Kleverweis, Clay Tarver, Dan O’Keefe, Michael Rotenberg, Tom Lassally
 Veep (HBO) – Armando Iannucci, Chris Addison, Simon Blackwell, Christopher Godsick, Stephanie Laing, Julia Louis-Dreyfus, Frank Rich, Tony Roche, Kevin Cecil, Roger Drew, Sean Gray, Ian Martin, Georgia Pritchett, David Quantick, Andy Riley, Will Smith, Bill Hill
|-
! colspan="2" style="background:#abcdef;"| David L. Wolper Award for Outstanding Producer of Long-Form Television
|-
| colspan="2" style="vertical-align:top;"|
 Fargo (FX) – Noah Hawley, John Cameron, Ethan Coen, Joel Coen, Warren Littlefield, Kim Todd American Crime (ABC) – John Ridley, Michael McDonald, Julie Hébert, Stacy Littlejohn, Diana Son, Keith Huff, Lori-Etta Taub
 American Horror Story: Hotel (FX) – Brad Falchuk, Ryan Murphy, Bradley Buecker, Tim Minear, Jennifer Salt, James Wong, Alexis Martin Woodall, Robert M. Williams Jr.
 True Detective (HBO) – Nic Pizzolatto, Scott Stephens, Steve Golin, Aida Rodgers
 A Very Murray Christmas (Netflix) – Sofia Coppola, Roman Coppola, Mitch Glazer, Tony Hernandez, Bill Murray, Michael Zakin
|-
! colspan="2" style="background:#abcdef;"| Outstanding Producer of Non-Fiction Television
|-
| colspan="2" style="vertical-align:top;"|
 The Jinx: The Life and Deaths of Robert Durst (HBO) – Marc Smerling, Andrew Jarecki, Jason Blum 30 for 30 (ESPN) – Connor Schell, John Dahl, Bill Simmons, Erin Leyden, Andrew Billman, Marquis Daisy, Libby Geist
 Anthony Bourdain: Parts Unknown (CNN) – Anthony Bourdain, Christopher Collins, Lydia Tenaglia, Sandra Zweig
 Shark Tank (ABC) – Mark Burnett, Clay Newbill, Yun Lingner, Max Swedlow, Jim Roush, Brandon Wallace, Becky Blitz, Laura Roush, Shaun Polakow, Phil Gurin
 Vice (ABC) – BJ Levin, Bill Maher, Eddy Moretti, Shane Smith, Jonah Kaplan, Tim Clancy, Ben Anderson, Shawn Killebrew
|-
! colspan="2" style="background:#abcdef;"| Outstanding Producer of Competition Television
|-
| colspan="2" style="vertical-align:top;"|
 The Voice (NBC) – Audrey Morrissey, Mark Burnett, John de Mol, Marc Jansen, Lee Metzger, Chad Hines, Jim Roush, Kyra Thompson, Mike Yurchuk, Amanda Zucker The Amazing Race (CBS) – Jerry Bruckheimer, Bertram van Munster, Jonathan Littman, Elise Doganieri, Mark Vertullo
 Dancing with the Stars (ABC) – Rob Wade, Ashley Edens-Shaffer, Joe Sungkur
 Project Runway (Lifetime) – Jonathan Murray, Sara Rea, Desiree Gruber, Jane Cha, Heidi Klum, Tim Gunn, Teri Weideman
 Top Chef (Bravo) – Daniel Cutforth, Tom Colicchio, Chaz Gray, Casey Kriley, Padma Lakshmi, Jane Lipsitz, Doneen Arquines, Erica Ross

|-
! colspan="2" style="background:#abcdef;"| Outstanding Producer of Live Entertainment & Talk Television
|-
| colspan="2" style="vertical-align:top;"|
 Last Week Tonight with John Oliver (HBO) – Tim Carvell, John Oliver, Liz Stanton The Colbert Report (Comedy Central) – Stephen T. Colbert, Tom Purcell, Jon Stewart, Meredith Bennett, Barry Julien, Emily Lazar, Tanya Michnevich Bracco, Paul Dinello, Matt Lappin
 Key & Peele (Comedy Central) – Jay Martel, Ian Roberts, Keegan-Michael Key, Jordan Peele, Joel Zadak, Peter Principato, Peter Atencio, Linda Morel

 Real Time with Bill Maher (HBO) – Bill Maher, Scott Carter, Sheila Griffiths, Marc Gurvitz, Billy Martin, Dean E. Johnsen, Matt Wood
 The Tonight Show Starring Jimmy Fallon (NBC) – Lorne Michaels, Jamie Granet Bederman, Katie Hockmeyer, Jim Juvonen, Brian McDonald, Josh Lieb, Gavin Purcell
|-
! colspan="2" style="background:#abcdef;"| Outstanding Sports Program
|-
| colspan="2" style="vertical-align:top;"|
 Real Sports with Bryant Gumbel
 Back on Board: Greg Louganis
 E:60
 Hard Knocks: Training Camp With the Houston Texans
 Kareem: Minority of One
|-
! colspan="2" style="background:#abcdef;"| Outstanding Children's Program
|-
| colspan="2" style="vertical-align:top;"|
 Sesame Street (PBS) Doc McStuffins (Disney Junior)
 The Fairly OddParents (Nickelodeon)
 The Octonauts (Disney Junior)
 Teenage Mutant Ninja Turtles (Nickelodeon)
 Toy Story That Time Forgot (ABC)
|}

Digital

Milestone Award
 Tom RothmanStanley Kramer Award
 The Hunting Ground

Visionary Award
 Industrial Light & Magic

David O. Selznick Achievement Award in Theatrical Motion Pictures
 David Heyman

Norman Lear Achievement Award in Television
 Shonda Rhimes

References

External links
 

 2015
2015 film awards
2015 television awards